The C&C 46 is a Canadian sailboat, that was designed by C&C Design and first built in 1973.

Production
The design was built by C&C Yachts in Canada, but it is now out of production.

Design
The C&C 46 is a small recreational keelboat, built predominantly of fibreglass, with wood trim. It has a masthead sloop rig, an internally-mounted spade-type rudder controlled by a wheel  and a fixed fin keel with lead ballast. It displaces .

See also
List of sailing boat types

References

Keelboats
1970s sailboat type designs
Sailing yachts
Sailboat type designs by C&C Design
Sailboat types built by C&C Yachts